Tokyo Fiancée is a 2014 Belgian romance-drama film written and directed by Stefan Liberski. It is based on Amélie Nothomb's 2007 autographical novel of the same name. The movie tells the story of a 21-year-old Belgian woman, Amélie (Pauline Étienne), who has a romance with Rinri (Taichi Inoue), a young Japanese man in Tokyo. She met him when she offered French language tutoring services through a bulletin board. It was selected to be screened in the Contemporary World Cinema section at the 2014 Toronto International Film Festival. It received three nominations at the 5th Magritte Awards.

Plot
Amélie (Pauline Étienne) is a Japanese-born woman who left at age five and grew up in Europe. At age 20, she decided to return to Japan to reconnect with the Japanese culture. She moves to a small apartment in Tokyo. To make a living, she puts up a poster offering French language tutoring. A young Japanese man, Rinri (Taichi Inoue), starts taking language lessons with her. The two become romantically involved, and Rinri helps her to learn about Japanese culture by taking her to movies, restaurants and other events. She also takes a trip to Mount Fuji, where she gets lost and survives a cold night in a remote cabin. After the earthquake causes severe damage and loss of life, though, her neighbours and Rinri tell her that she must return to Europe, as the disaster is for Japan to deal with.  On the plane, she says that she never saw Rinri again, and that she heard that he had married a Frenchwoman, a general's daughter. As for her, she'll keep that for another time.

Cast
 Pauline Étienne as Amélie
 Taichi Inoue as Rinri
 Julie Le Breton as Christine
 Alice de Lencquesaing as Yasmine
 Akimi Ota as Hara
 Hiroki Kageyama as Hiroki

References

External links
 

2014 films
2014 romantic drama films
Belgian romantic drama films
2010s French-language films
2010s Japanese-language films
Films set in Tokyo
Japan in non-Japanese culture
2014 multilingual films
French-language Belgian films
Belgian multilingual films